Dehnow-e Gudarz (also Romanized as Dehnow-e Gūdarz and Dehnow-ye Gūdarz) is a village in Rig Rural District, in the Central District of Lordegan County, Chaharmahal and Bakhtiari Province, Iran. At the 2006 census, its population was 200, in 46 families.

References 

Populated places in Lordegan County